Pterostylis trullifolia, commonly known as the trowel-leaved greenhood, is an orchid species endemic to New Zealand. As with similar orchids, the flowering plants differ from those which are not flowering. The non-flowering plants have a rosette of wrinkled, trowel-shaped leaves but the flowering plants have a single flower with a bulging, platform-like sinus between the lateral sepals and leaves on the flowering spike.

Description
The dorsal sepal and petals are fused, forming a hood or "galea" over the column, the dorsal sepal curving forward with a short-pointed tip. The lateral sepals are held closely against the galea and have erect, thread-like tips much taller than the gales. There is a bulging U-shaped sinus between the bases of the lateral sepals. The labellum is dark brown to reddish-brown and protrudes above the sinus. Flowering occurs from May to September.

Taxonomy and naming
Pterostylis trullifolia was first formally described in 1853 by Joseph Dalton Hooker and the description was published in The Botany of the Antarctic Voyage of H.M. Discovery Ships Erebus and Terror in the years 1839–1843, under the Command of Captain Sir James Clark Ross. The specific epithet (trullifolia) is derived from the Latin words trulla meaning "trowel" and folia  meaning "leaves".

Distribution and habitat
It sometimes invades rough pasture and lawns near forests. It is widespread on the North Island and Three Kings Islands and on the South Island north of Canterbury.

References

trullifolia
Endemic orchids of New Zealand
Plants described in 1853